= Hols IF =

Swedish sports club

- Full name: Hols idrottsförening
- Sport: soccer bandy table tennis athletics handball skiing (earlier)
- Founded: 30 April 1944
- Based in: Bjuråker, Sweden
- Arena: Hols IP

Hols IF is a sports club in Hol, Sweden, established 30 April 1944.

The women's soccer team played in the Swedish top division in 1978.
